Many countries have a national sport stadium, which typically serves as the primary or exclusive home for one or more of a country's national representative sports teams.  The term is most often used in reference to an association football stadium.  Usually, a national stadium will be in or very near a country's capital city or largest city.  It is generally (but not always) the country's largest and most lavish sports venue with a rich history of hosting a major moment in sports (e.g. FIFA World Cup, Olympics, etc.).  In many, but not all cases, it is also used by a local team.  Many countries, including Spain and the United States, do not have a national stadium designated as such; instead matches are rotated throughout the country.  The lack of a national stadium can be seen as advantageous as designating a single stadium would limit the fan base capable of realistically attending matches as well as the concern of the cost of transportation, especially in the case of the United States due to its geographical size and high population.

A list of national stadiums follows:

Afghanistan
Ghazi Amanullah International Cricket Stadium (cricket)
National Stadium (football)

Albania
Arena Kombëtare

Algeria
Stade 5 Juillet 1962 (football)

American Samoa
Veterans Memorial Stadium (football)

Andorra
Estadi Nacional (football and rugby union)
Estadi Comunal d'Andorra la Vella (football)
Poliesportiu d'Andorra (basketball and roller hockey)

Angola
Estádio 11 de Novembro (football)

Antigua and Barbuda
Antigua Recreation Ground (cricket and football)

Argentina
Estadio Multipropósito Parque Roca (basketball and tennis)
Estadio Nacional de Hockey (field hockey)
Campo Argentino de Polo (polo)
CeNARD (athletics)
Estadio José Amalfitani, also known as Vélez Sársfield (rugby union)—Although the national team plays Tests at several venues around the country, most of their home Tests against teams in the Six Nations and Tri Nations are held here.

Armenia
Hrazdan Stadium (football)
Vazgen Sargsyan Republican Stadium (football)

Aruba
Trinidad Stadium (football and athletics)

Australia
Australia does not have an official national stadium, yet its three biggest stadiums alternate hosting large events are the following:

Melbourne Cricket Ground (Cricket and Australian rules football) - currently the largest sporting venue in Australia and the largest in the Southern Hemisphere with a capacity of 100,024.
Stadium Australia, currently known under a sponsorship deal as 'Accor Stadium' - was the 2000 Sydney Olympic Stadium (at the time with a capacity of 110,000), and now hosts Rugby League, Rugby Union, Association football and AFL matches with a capacity of 84,000. There exists a popular rivalry between ANZ Stadium and the MCG due to lasting rivalries between football codes and the respective cities. Cricket is currently not played at the venue.
Perth Stadium, currently known under a sponsorship deal as 'Optus Stadium' It is the third largest stadium in Australia. The Stadium can normally hold 60,000 people with potential to be reconfigured to 70,000 seats. It hosts AFL and Cricket regularly, but has also hosted important Association football, Rugby League and Rugby Union matches.

Austria
Ernst Happel Stadion (football)

Azerbaijan
Baku National Stadium (football)

Bahamas
Thomas Robinson Stadium (football and athletics)

Bahrain
Bahrain National Stadium (football)

Bangladesh
Bangabandhu National Stadium (football and athletics)
Sher-e-Bangla National Cricket Stadium (cricket)

Barbados
Aquatic Centre (artistic swimming, swimming, and water polo)
Barbados National Stadium (football, outdoor track and field)

Belarus
Dinamo Stadium (football and athletics)
National Football Stadium (football)

Belgium
King Baudouin Stadium (football and athletics)

Belize
FFB Stadium (football)

Benin
Stade de l'Amitié (football)

Bermuda
Bermuda National Stadium (football, rugby union, athletics and cricket)

Bhutan
Changlimithang Stadium (football and archery)

Bolivia
Estadio Hernando Siles (football and athletics)

Bosnia and Herzegovina
Bilino Polje Stadium
Koševo Olympic Stadium

Botswana
Botswana National Stadium (football)

Brazil
 Brazil does not have an official national stadium. Mostly (football) matches are commonly held in alternate venues. However, during reconstruction for the 2014 FIFA World Cup and as the capital city's and country's greatest stadium, the name Estádio Nacional (Portuguese for National Stadium) was added to the old Mané Garrincha stadium, leaving its official name as Estádio Nacional de Brasília Mané Garrincha, even though it doesn't act as a solo national stadium. The largest and most well known stadium in Brazil is Estádio do Maracanã located at Rio de Janeiro. The Brazil national football team have most of their high-profile matches in the Maracanã and the venue has hosted multiple World Cup and Copa America matches throughout its history including the two World Cup finals that Brazil has hosted (1950 and 2014).

Ginásio do Maracanãzinho (futsal, volleyball and basketball)

Brunei Darussalam
Sultan Hassanal Bolkiah Stadium (football)

Bulgaria
Vasil Levski National Stadium (football and athletics)

Burkina Faso
Stade du 4-Août (football)

Burundi
Intwari Stadium (football)

Cambodia
Phnom Penh National Olympic Stadium (football and athletics)

Morodok Techo National Stadium (football and athletics)

Cameroon
Stade Ahmadou Ahidjo (football and athletics)

Canada
Aviva Centre & Stade IGA (tennis)
BC Place (soccer & rugby union). Although a 2007 report from FIFA referred to BMO Field as Canada's national stadium, due to BC Place's indoor field being playable year-round and its higher capacity, many major soccer events are held there instead, such as the final match of the 2015 FIFA Women's World Cup. Similarly, while the national rugby team has no official stadium, most of their matches are split between BC Place and BMO Field 
BMO Field (soccer & rugby union) 
Lamport Stadium (rugby league)
Maple Leaf Cricket Club (cricket)
Rogers Centre (baseball)
Scotiabank Arena (basketball)
Canada does not have a national stadium/arena for ice hockey. The national team plays at several venues throughout the country. Likewise, Canadian football and lacrosse, two prominent sports unique to Canadian culture, play at multiple venues across the nation.

Prior to confederation into Canada, the Dominion of Newfoundland used King George V Park as its national stadium.

Cape Verde
Estádio Nacional de Cabo Verde (football)

Central African Republic
Stade Barthélemy Boganda (football)

Chad
Stade Idriss Mahamat Ouya (football)

Chile
Estadio Nacional Julio Martínez Prádanos (football)
Court Central Anita Lizana (tennis)

China
Beijing National Stadium (Athletics)
National Tennis Center (Tennis)
The China national football team does not have a national stadium. Mostly matches except major competitions are commonly held in alternate venues across the country. They are rarely played in Beijing due to concerns of security.

Colombia
Estadio Metropolitano Roberto Meléndez (football)

Comoros
Stade Said Mohamed Cheikh (football)

Democratic Republic of the Congo
Stade des Martyrs (football and athletics)

Republic of the Congo
Stade Alphonse Massemba-Débat (football)

Cook Islands
National Stadium (Cook Islands)

Costa Rica
Estadio Nacional de Costa Rica (football and athletics)

Croatia
There is no official national stadium. The following two stadiums are the largest and most commonly host international events:
 Stadion Maksimir
 Stadion Poljud

Cuba
Estadio Latinoamericano (baseball)

Cyprus
GSP Stadium (football)

Czech Republic
Strahov Stadium (sokol)
Sinobo Stadium (football)
O2 arena (ice hockey)

Denmark
Parken Stadium (football)
Royal Arena (handball and ice hockey)
Svanholm Park (cricket)

Djibouti
Stade du Ville

Dominica
Windsor Park (cricket and football)

Dominican Republic
Estadio Olímpico Félix Sánchez (athletics and football)
Estadio Quisqueya (baseball)

East Timor
Estadio Nacional (East Timor) (football)

Ecuador
Estadio Olímpico Atahualpa (football and athletics)

Egypt
Borg El Arab Stadium (football)
Cairo International Stadium (football and athletics)

El Salvador
Estadio Cuscatlán (football)

Equatorial Guinea
Nuevo Estadio de Malabo (football)

Eritrea
Cicero Stadium (football)

Estonia
Kadriorg Stadium (athletics)
Lilleküla Stadium (football)

Eswatini
Somhlolo National Stadium (association football)

Ethiopia
Addis Ababa Stadium (football)
Bahir Dar Stadium (football)

Faroe Islands
Tórsvøllur (football)

Fiji
HFC Bank Stadium (football and rugby union)
National Hockey Centre (field hockey)

Finland
Helsinki Olympic Stadium (football and athletics)
Hartwall Areena (ice hockey)

France
Stade de France (football, rugby union, and athletics)
In the case of rugby, the national team plays Test matches throughout the country, but it uses Stade de France exclusively for its fixtures in the Six Nations Championship.

Gabon
Stade Omar Bongo (football)

The Gambia
Independence Stadium (Bakau) (football)

Georgia
Boris Paichadze Dinamo Arena (football and rugby union)

Germany
The Germany national football team usually plays at different stadiums throughout the country. However, the venue for the German Cup Final is the Olympiastadion in Berlin. As a multipurpose stadium, the Berlin Olympiastadion also hosts international athletic competitions and other events. However, the Munich Olympiastadion was used for the finals of international football competitions held during the later West German era, such in the 1974 FIFA World Cup and UEFA Euro 1988.
Lanxess Arena (handball and ice hockey)
Mercedes-Benz Arena (basketball)
Gerry Weber Stadion (tennis)
Warsteiner HockeyPark (field hockey)
Fritz-Grunebaum-Sportpark (rugby union)

Ghana
Ohene Djan Stadium (football)

Greece
Olympic Stadium (Football and athletics)
O.A.C.A. Olympic Indoor Hall (Basketball)

Greenland
Nuuk Stadium (football)
New National Stadium (proposed)

Grenada
Kirani James Athletic Stadium (football and athletics)
Queen's Park (cricket)

Guatemala
Estadio Doroteo Guamuch Flores (football and athletics)

Guinea
Stade 28 Septembre (football)

Guinea-Bissau
Estádio 24 de Setembro (football)

Guyana
Bourda (cricket)

Haiti
Stade Sylvio Cator (football)

Honduras
Estadio Olímpico Metropolitano (football and athletics)
Estadio Nacional Chelato Uclés (football)

Hong Kong
Hong Kong Stadium (football and rugby sevens)

Hungary
Puskás Aréna (football)

Iceland
Laugardalsvöllur (football)

India
 The India national cricket team plays matches at many different grounds
 The India national football team plays matches at many different stadiums
 Jawaharlal Nehru Stadium (athletics)
 Major Dhyan Chand National Stadium (field hockey)

Indonesia
Gelora Bung Karno Stadium (association football)
Gelora Bung Karno Madya Stadium (athletics)
Istora Gelora Bung Karno (Badminton)

Iran
Azadi Stadium

Iraq
Al-Shaab Stadium
Basra Sports City

Republic of Ireland
Team sports in Ireland are often governed by bodies representing both Republic of Ireland and Northern Ireland, on an All-Ireland basis. See the Northern Ireland section for other cases.

The following venues are "designated national sporting arenas" for the purposes of Section 21 of the Intoxicating Liquor Act 2003 (which regulates sale of alcohol at sports venues): 
National Stadium,
Croke Park, 
Semple Stadium,
Royal Dublin Society,
Aviva Stadium,
Thomond Park.

Israel
Sammy Ofer Stadium, Haifa (association football (soccer))
Teddy Stadium, Jerusalem (association football (soccer))
Bloomfield Stadium, Tel Aviv (association football (soccer))
Netanya Stadium, Netanya (association football (soccer))
Turner Stadium, Be'er Sheva (association football (soccer))
Menora Mivtachim Arena, Tel Aviv (Basketball)
Drive in Arena, Tel Aviv (Basketball)
Drive in Arena, Tel Aviv (Judo)
Pais Arena, Jerusalem (Judo)
Canada Stadium, Ramat HaSharon (Tennis)

Italy
The Italy national football team usually plays at different stadiums throughout the country.
Stadio Olimpico (Olympics and rugby union)
 In the case of rugby union, the national team plays matches throughout the country, but since 2012 has used Stadio Olimpico for all of its home Six Nations matches. Previously, Stadio Flaminio served the same purpose.
PalaLottomatica, Mediolanum Forum and Pala Alpitour serve to (basketball and volleyball) matches.
Stadio Steno Borghese (baseball)
PalaLido (roller hockey, handball, gymnastics, and wrestling)
Pala Alpitour (ice hockey)
Velodromo Vigorelli (American football)
Massimo Falsetti Cricket Field (cricket)

Ivory Coast
Stade Félix Houphouët-Boigny (football)
Stade National de la Côte d’Ivoire (Association football; under construction)

Jamaica
Independence Park (football and athletics)
Sabina Park (cricket)

Japan
 Ariake Coliseum (tennis)
 Tokyo Dome (baseball)
 Koshien Stadium (baseball)
 National Stadium (football and athletics)
 International Stadium Yokohama (football)
 Chichibunomiya Rugby Stadium (rugby union)—The Japan national team plays matches at several venues around the country, but Chichibunomiya is the most commonly used, and the country's national federation is headquartered here.
 Kokugikan (Sumo)

Jordan
Amman International Stadium (football)
King Abdullah II Stadium (football)

Kazakhstan
Astana Arena (football)

Kenya
Nyayo National Stadium (Association football, athletics, and basketball)
Kasarani Stadium (football and athletics)

Kiribati
Bairiki National Stadium (football)

Republic of Korea
Seoul Olympic Stadium (athletics)
Seoul World Cup Stadium (football)
Jamsil Baseball Stadium (Baseball)

Democratic People's Republic of Korea
Kim Il-sung Stadium (football and athletics)
Rungnado May Day Stadium

Kosovo
Fadil Vokrri Stadium (football)
Palace of Youth and Sports (basket)

Kurdistan
Franso Hariri Stadium (football and athletics)

Kuwait
Jaber Al-Ahmad International Stadium (football)

Kyrgyzstan
Spartak Stadium (football and athletics)

Latvia
Arēna Rīga (basketball, ice hockey, and volleyball)
Nacionālais Stadions Daugava (association football)

Lesotho
Setsoto Stadium (football and athletics)

Lebanon
Camille Chamoun Sports City Stadium

Liberia
Samuel Kanyon Doe Sports Complex (association football)

Libya
Tripoli Stadium (association football)

Liechtenstein
Rheinpark Stadion (football)

Lithuania
Žalgiris Arena (basketball)
Darius and Girėnas Stadium (football) – since 2022
LFF Stadium (football) – owned and operated by the Lithuanian Football Federation.
Utena Hippodrome  (baseball)

Luxembourg
Stade de Luxembourg  (football & rugby union)
d'Coque (basketball, handball & volleyball)
Kockelscheuer Sport Centre (tennis)
Pierre Werner Cricket Ground (cricket)

Macau
Macau East Asian Games Dome (track and field, basketball and badminton)
Estádio Campo Desportivo

Malawi
Bingu National Stadium (football and athletics)

Malaysia
Arena Nicol David (squash)
Axiata Arena (badminton)
Stadium Negara
Bukit Jalil National Stadium (Football and athletics)

National Hockey Stadium (Field Hockey)

Maldives
National Football Stadium (football)

Mali
Stade du 26 Mars (Football and athletics)

Malta
Ta' Qali Stadium (football)
Hibernians Ground (Rugby union)

Martinique
Stade d'Honneur (football and athletics)

Mauritania
Complexe Olympique de la République Islamique de Mauritanie (football)

Mauritius
Anjalay Stadium (association football and athletics)
Arsenal Football Ground (association football)
Auguste Vollaire Stadium (association football and athletics)
Bon Acceuil Sports Complex (badminton, jujutsu, karate, and volleyball)
Glen Park Multi Sports Complex (association football, badminton, basketball, handball, karate, pétanque, table tennis, and taekwondo)
Harry Latour Stadium (association football)
Mare D'Albert Swimming Pool (swimming)
Morcellement St Andre Football Ground (association football)
National Badminton Centre (badminton)
National Boxing Centre (boxing)
National Judo Centre (judo, karate, savate, and wrestling)
National Table Tennis Centre (table tennis)
National Weightlifting Centre (Olympic weightlifting)
National Wrestling Centre (wrestling)
New George V Stadium (association football)
Pandit Sahadeo Gymnasium (volleyball)
Pavillon Swimming Pool (swimming)
Quartier Militaire Stadium (association football)
Rivière du Rempart Swimming Pool (swimming)
Rose Belle Stadium (association football and athletics)
Rose Hill Multi-Purpose Training Complex (association football, basketball, handball, tennis, and volleyball)
Serge Alfred Swimming Pool (swimming)
Sir. R. Ghurburrun Stadium (association football)
Souvenir Swimming Pool (swimming)
St François Xavier Stadium (association football)
Stade Germain Comarmond (association football and athletics)
The Basketball and Handball Gymnasium (basketball and handball)

Mexico
Estadio Azteca (football)
Estadio Olimpico Universitario (athletics)
Revolution Ice Rink (ice hockey)
Mexico does not have a national arena/stadium for baseball or basketball.  Mexico's national baseball and basketball teams play at various venues throughout the country.

Moldova
Zimbru Stadium (football)
Complexul Sportiv Raional Orhei (rugby union)

Monaco
Stade Louis II (football and athletics)
Salle Gaston Médecin (basketball, volleyball, handball, judo, fencing, weightlifting and gymnastics)
Monte Carlo Country Club (tennis)

Montenegro
Podgorica City Stadium (football)

Morocco
 Stade Mohammed V (football, athletics)
 Prince Moulay Abdellah Stadium (football, athletics)
 Salle Moulay Abdellah (volleyball, basketball, handball)
 Salle Mohammed V (volleyball, basketball, handball)
 Stade Père Jégo (rugby union)

Myanmar
Bogyoke Aung San Stadium
National Indoor Stadium (badminton)
Thuwunna Stadium (association football)
Wunna Theikdi Sports Stadium (association football)

Namibia
Independence Stadium  (athletics and football)
Hage Geingob Stadium  (rugby union)
Wanderers Cricket Ground  (cricket)

Nepal
Dasarath Rangasala Stadium (association football and athletics)
Pokhara Stadium (multi-purpose)
Sahid Stadium (association football)
NSC Covered Hall (basketball and taekwondo)
Tribhuvan University International Cricket Ground (cricket)

Netherlands
 Olympisch Stadion  (athletics)
 The national football team has no dedicated stadium. It plays at venues around the country. However the most commonly used stadium is the Amsterdam ArenA in Amsterdam, home to Eredivisie club Ajax
 Wagener Stadium  (field hockey)
 VRA Cricket Ground  (cricket)
 Thialf  (speed skating)
 Nationaal Rugby Centrum Amsterdam  (rugby union)

Nicaragua
Estadio Dennis Martinez (baseball and football)

Niger
Stade Général Seyni Kountché (association football and athletics)

Nigeria
 Godswill Akpabio International Stadium (football and other sports)
 Moshood Abiola National Stadium (football and other sports)
 Lagos National Stadium (football and other sports)

Norway
Ullevaal Stadion (football)
Bislett Stadion (athletics)
Holmenkollen National Arena (nordic skiing and biathlon)

North Macedonia
Toše Proeski Arena (football)

Oman
Sultan Qaboos Sports Complex (association football)

Pakistan
National Stadium, Karachi (Cricket)
Gaddafi Stadium, Lahore (Cricket)
Punjab Stadium, Lahore (Football)
National Hockey Stadium, Lahore (Field hockey)

Palau
Palau National Stadium (PCC Palau Track & Field Stadium), (football and other sports)

Panama
Estadio Nacional de Panamá (baseball)
Estadio Rommel Fernández (Football)

Papua New Guinea
Sir Hubert Murray Stadium (rugby league, football)

Paraguay
Estadio Defensores del Chaco (football)

Peru
Estadio Nacional (Lima) (football and athletics)

Philippines
Rizal Memorial Sports Complex
Rizal Memorial Baseball Stadium (baseball) 
Rizal Memorial Coliseum (basketball and other indoor sports) 
Rizal Memorial Stadium (athletics, football) 
New Clark City Athletics Stadium (athletics)

Poland
 Stadion Śląski (football) - this stadium was previously designated by Polish Football Association as Poland national football team's official national stadium.
 Stadion Narodowy (football) - home stadium of Poland national football team.
 National Rugby Stadium, rugby union national stadium
 Torwar Hala Sportowo-Widowiskowa (judo)
 Torwar II Lodowisko (figure skating)

Portugal
Estádio do Jamor (football and athletics). However, the national football team very seldom plays there.
Estádio Universitário de Lisboa (rugby union)
Estoril Court Central (tennis)
Altice Arena (futsal, roller hockey, basketball, handball and volleyball)

Puerto Rico
Hiram Bithorn Stadium, San Juan, a baseball park

Qatar
Jassim bin Hamad Stadium (football)
Khalifa International Stadium (football)

Romania
Arena Națională (football)
Stadionul Național de Rugby (rugby union) — The national team plays occasional matches at other venues around the country, but the vast majority of matches are held here.

Russia
Luzhniki Stadium (football and athletics)

Rwanda
Amahoro National Stadium (association football)
Kigali Arena (basketball)

Saint Kitts and Nevis
Warner Park Sporting Complex (cricket and football)

Saint Lucia
George Odlum Stadium (Association football and athletics)

Saint Vincent and the Grenadines
Arnos Vale Stadium (cricket and football)

San Marino
San Marino Stadium (football)
Stadio di Baseball di Serravalle (baseball)

Serbia
Partizan Stadium (football)
Red Star Stadium (football)
Belgrade Arena (basketball)

Singapore
National Stadium (football, athletics)
Jalan Besar Stadium (football)

Slovakia
Aegon Arena (tennis)
National football stadium (football)
Ondrej Nepela Arena (ice hockey)

Slovenia
There is no official national stadium or arena. International events are usually hosted in the largest stadium or arena in the country. 
Stadion Stožice (football)
Arena Stožice (basketball, ice hockey, handball, volleyball)

Somalia
Eng. Yariisow Stadium (association football)
Mogadishu Stadium

Spain
The Spain national football team usually plays at different stadiums throughout the country.
 Palacio de Deportes de la Comunidad de Madrid (basketball and handball)
 Caja Mágica (tennis)
 Estadio Nacional Complutense (rugby union)(camp buernebeu)

Sierra Leone
 National Stadium (football and athletics)

South Africa
The national football, rugby union and cricket teams all play at various venues throughout South Africa. However, these are the de facto national stadiums:

Soccer City (football)
Newlands (rugby union)
The Wanderers (cricket)
Randburg Astroturf (field hockey)
Loftus Versfeld (Rugby Union)

Suriname
André Kamperveen Stadion (football)

Sweden
 Friends Arena (men's football)
 Gamla Ullevi (women's football)
 Tele2 Arena (American football, speedway)
 Stockholms Stadion (athletics)
 Ericsson Globe (ice hockey)
 Lugnet (nordic skiing)
 Åre Ski Area (alpine skiing)
 Östersund Ski Stadium (biathlon)
 Stadium Arena (basketball)
 Nya Örvallen (baseball)
 Eriksdalsbadet (swimming)

Switzerland
Because Switzerland has a strong federalism opinion in most sports are no national stadiums.
The Switzerland Davis Cup team (Tennis) plays most of there ties in Palexpo in Geneva.

Syria
Abbasiyyin Stadium (football)
Aleppo International Stadium (football)

Taiwan
Kaohsiung National Stadium (a.k.a. World Games Stadium) (football and athletics)

Tajikistan
Pamir Stadium (football and athletics)

Tanzania
Tanzania National Main Stadium (football and athletics)

Thailand
Rajamangala Stadium (football and athletics)
National Stadium (Thailand) (football and athletics)

Togo
Stade de Kégué (football)

Trinidad and Tobago
Hasely Crawford Stadium (football and athletics)

Turkey
Atatürk Olympic Stadium (football and athletics)

Turkmenistan
Olympic Stadium (football and athletics)

Tunisia
 Stade Olympique de Rades (football and athletics)
 Stade El Menzah (football)
 Stade Mustapha Ben Jannet (football)
 Salle Omnisport de Rades (Basketball), (Handball) and (Volleyball)

Uganda
Mandela National Stadium (football and athletics)

Ukraine
Olimpiysky National Sports Complex (football and athletics)

United Arab Emirates
Abu Dhabi International Tennis Centre (tennis)
Al Maktoum Stadium (association football)
Al Nahyan Stadium (association football)
Hazza bin Zayed Stadium (association football)
Maktoum bin Rashid Al Maktoum Stadium (association football)
Mohammed bin Zayed Stadium (association football)
Zabeel Stadium (association football)
Zayed Sports City Stadium (association football)

United Kingdom 
Team sports in the United Kingdom are often governed by bodies representing the Home Nations of England, Scotland, Wales and Northern Ireland – with some sports organised on an All-Ireland basis. In international sporting events these sports are contested not by a team representing the United Kingdom, but by teams representing the separate home nations, and as a result there are separate national stadiums for many sports.

London Stadium (athletics)
Wimbledon Centre Court (Tennis)
Silverstone Circuit (Motorsport)

England 
Lord's (cricket)
Twickenham (rugby union)
Wembley Stadium (football, rugby league)

Northern Ireland 
Windsor Park (football)

Scotland 
Hampden Park (football)
Murrayfield (rugby union)
The Grange (cricket)

Wales 
The former National Stadium (rugby union, football)
Millennium Stadium (rugby union, football)
Sophia Gardens (cricket)
Cardiff City Stadium (football)

United States 
USA Hockey has designated home arenas for some of its teams. The national under-17 and under-18 boys' teams play home games at USA Hockey Arena in Plymouth, Michigan. The national sled hockey team trains at Bill Gray's Regional Iceplex in Brighton, New York and plays most of its home games at LECOM Harborcenter in Buffalo, New York, the last of which has also hosted numerous other USA Hockey events.
Most of the most popular sports in the United States do not rely on a single national stadium, instead rotating the highest profile contests among various neutral sites.
Howard J. Lamade Stadium (Little League Baseball)—Lamade Stadium is the primary stadium of the Little League World Series, hosting the final every year. It is one of two stadiums at the Little League headquarters complex in South Williamsport, Pennsylvania that permanently hosts the LLWS, with Volunteer Stadium as the other.
Augusta National Golf Club (men's golf)—Augusta is home of The Masters, the only one of the three U.S.-based men's major golf tournaments to be held at a constant venue year after year; the U.S. Open and PGA Championship are both held at rotating venues.
Mission Hills Country Club (women's golf)—Mission Hills hosts the ANA Inspiration, only one of the three U.S.-based women's major golf tournaments to be held at a constant venue year after year; the U.S. Women's Open and Women's PGA Championship are both held at rotating venues.
Arthur Ashe Stadium (tennis)—primary stadium of the lone U.S. tennis major, the US Open. The stadium is the centerpiece of a complex known as the USTA Billie Jean King National Tennis Center.
Auto racing, although its leading competitions are both touring circuits, feature flagship races at de facto national speedways: Indianapolis Motor Speedway for open-wheel racing, Circuit of the Americas for Formula One, and Daytona International Speedway for stock car racing.
Churchill Downs and Belmont Park (horse racing)—each track hosts a leg in the Triple Crown of American Thoroughbred Racing, and both have hosted the most prominent race outside the Triple Crown, the Breeders' Cup Classic, which is part of the Breeders' Cup event held annually at rotating venues. (Pimlico, the site of the other leg of the Triple Crown, has never hosted the Breeders' Cup.)
 Like Spain, Brazil, Australia, Germany, and Italy, the US national soccer team has no dedicated stadium or arena. They play at different venues throughout the country for exhibition or tournament purposes. However, 21 games were held in RFK Stadium in the country's capital, Washington, D.C., more than any other venue in the country, which led to suggestions that RFK Memorial was the de facto national stadium prior to its 2019 closure. The women's soccer team also has no dedicated venue.
 USA Softball Hall of Fame Stadium serves as the home of the men's and women's national teams as well as the headquarters of USA Softball.

Uruguay
Estadio Centenario (football)
Estadio Charrúa (rugby union)

Uzbekistan
Milliy Stadium (association football)
Pakhtakor Central Stadium (association football)

Vatican City
Stadio Petriana (football)—because the Vatican City does not have enough territory to house a sports stadium, Stadio Petriana is in fact situated within the bounds of Italy.

Venezuela
Estadio Polideportivo de Pueblo Nuevo (football)

Vietnam
My Dinh National Stadium (football)
Hang Day Stadium
(Selected match)

Zambia
National Heroes Stadium (football)

Zimbabwe
 National Sports Stadium (football, rugby union and athletics)

References

 
Lists of stadiums